The 1944 Northwestern Wildcats team represented Northwestern University during the 1944 Big Ten Conference football season. In their tenth year under head coach Pappy Waldorf, the Wildcats compiled a 1–7–1 record (0–5–1 against Big Ten Conference opponents) and finished in eighth place in the Big Ten Conference.

Schedule

References

Northwestern
Northwestern Wildcats football seasons
Northwestern Wildcats football